Saint Vincent and the Grenadines competed at the 2000 Summer Olympics in Sydney, Australia with two track and field athletes and two swimmers.

Athletics

Men

Women

Swimming

Men

Women

See also
 Saint Vincent and the Grenadines at the 1998 Commonwealth Games
 Saint Vincent and the Grenadines at the 1999 Pan American Games
 Saint Vincent and the Grenadines at the 2002 Commonwealth Games

References
Official Olympic Reports
sports-reference

Nations at the 2000 Summer Olympics
2000